"Math Suks" is a song by Jimmy Buffett, from the album Beach House on the Moon (1999).

Background 
The lyrics tell of the author's frustration as a math student. The song's lyrics refer to hearing the phrase "Math sucks" on an interview on TV, though Buffett later noted that the inspiration actually came from graffiti on a bridge in Key West Florida. Mathematical  terms are used in a superficial way in the song, which drew criticism from mathematicians and mathematics teachers. The song was condemned by the US National Council of Teachers of Mathematics and the National Education Association for its alleged negative effect on children's education. Jon Stewart performed a comedy segment on The Daily Show referencing the song entitled "Math Is Quite Pleasant".

References

Jimmy Buffett songs
Mathematics and culture
1999 songs
Songs written by Jimmy Buffett